Petar Atanasov (born 25 December 1939) is a Megleno-Romanian linguist from North Macedonia. His scientific interests include lexicography and Aromanian, Megleno-Romanian and Romance linguistics. He was a professor in the Faculty of Philology at the Ss. Cyril and Methodius University of Skopje.

In 1995, the Office of the French Prime Minister issued the distinction Knight of the Order of Academic Palms to Atanasov for "his services to French culture". In 2011, Atanasov was awarded the medal Merit for the Education by the Office of President of Romania.

Publications

References

External links

1939 births
Living people
Linguists from North Macedonia
Recipients of the Ordre des Palmes Académiques
People from Gevgelija Municipality
Academic staff of the Ss. Cyril and Methodius University of Skopje
Megleno-Romanian people